N-Gage may refer to:

 N-Gage (device), a handheld gaming smartphone from Nokia, released in 2003
 N-Gage QD, a hardware revision of the N-Gage, released in 2004
 N-Gage (service), the former N-Gage service, containing many games for some Symbian S60 Nokia smartphones

See also 
 Engage (disambiguation)
 N scale, the model railway N gauge